Banksia erythrocephala is a species of prickly shrub that is endemic to Western Australia. It has erect stems, sharply pointed pinnatifid leaves, cream-coloured and reddish black or all cream-coloured and yellow flowers, and egg-shaped fruit.

Description
The flowers are borne on a head containing between fifteen and twenty-six flowers in each head.

Taxonomy and naming
This species was first formally described in 1928 by Charles Austin Gardner who gave it the name Dryandra erythrocephala and published the description in the Journal of the Royal Society of Western Australia from specimens he collected in 1926.

In 1996, Alex George described two varieties of this species:

In 2007, Austin Mast and Kevin Thiele transferred all the dryandras to the genus Banksia and this species became Banksia erythrocephala. The specific epithet (erythrocephala) is derived from ancient Greek words meaning "red" and "headed".

The two varieties described by George were renamed Banksia erythrocephala (C.A.Gardner) A.R.Mast & K.R.Thiele var. erythrocephala and Banksia erythrocephala var. inopinata (A.S.George) A.R.Mast & K.R.Thiele

Distribution and habitat
Banksia erythrocephala var. erythrocephala grows in kwongan between Kulin, Nyabing and east of Hyden. Variety inopinata grows in kwongan and has been recorded near Dumbleyung, Kulin and Nyabing.

Ecology
An assessment of the potential impact of climate change on this species found that it was likely to be driven to extinction by loss of habitat by 2080, even under mild climate change scenarios.

Conservation status
Variety inopinata is classified as "Priority Three" by the Government of Western Australia Department of Parks and Wildlife meaning that it is poorly known and known from only a few locations but is not under imminent threat but var. erythrocephala is listed as "not threatened".

References

erythrocephala
Endemic flora of Western Australia
Plants described in 1928
Taxa named by Kevin Thiele